Prince Thanyavong Savang (born 17 April 1964) is a surviving member of the now deposed royal family of the Kingdom of Laos.  He was born at the Royal Palace, Luang Prabang, Laos. His father is Crown Prince Vong Savang and his mother is Princess Mahneelai.

Biography

In 1981, he escaped from Luanprabang to Vientiane then to Thailand with his older brother Crown Prince Soulivong Savang, arriving in France as political refugees.

He is currently exiled and living in Florida, USA, and is active in  Lao communities abroad to help preserve and promote Lao culture.

Ancestry

References

External links
Laos Royals pay respects to September 11, 2001 Victims (Photos)

1964 births
Living people
Laotian royalty
Laotian exiles